KIPKOECH
It is a name given to a Kenyan kalenjin origin meaning "(male) born in the morning" loving, caring and understanding .It's very lucky to have him. Son/daughters of Kipkoech would then be named "Koech" as their last name and given their individual given names; achieved by just removing the prefix "kip" as it  happens to most other similar names that start with 'Kip" from that particular community or whoever understands the meaning and ways to inherit the name.

See also
Jepkoech (or Chepkoech), is a given name given to girls born in the morning or sunrise. You may also to see Kipkoech.

Kalenjin names